

Acts of the Scottish Parliament

|-
| {{|Writers to the Signet Dependants' Annuity Fund Amendment (Scotland) Act 2018|asp|2|18-01-2018|maintained=y|archived=n|An Act of the Scottish Parliament to amend the Writers to the Signet Dependants' Annuity Fund Order Confirmation Act 1982 to amend the definition of "actuary" and to amend the description of persons who may be elected collector of the Fund.}}
|-
| {{|Wild Animals in Travelling Circuses (Scotland) Act 2018|asp|3|24-01-2018|maintained=y|archived=n|An Act of the Scottish Parliament to make it an offence to use wild animals in travelling circuses.}}
|-
| {{|Gender Representation on Public Boards (Scotland) Act 2018|asp|4|09-03-2018|maintained=y|archived=n|An Act of the Scottish Parliament to make provision about gender representation on boards of Scottish public authorities.}}
|-
| {{|Domestic Abuse (Scotland) Act 2018|asp|5|09-03-2018|maintained=y|archived=n|An Act of the Scottish Parliament to create an offence with respect to the engaging by a person in a course of behaviour which is abusive of the person's partner or ex-partner; and to make rules of criminal procedure for that offence and also for offences subject to the statutory aggravation involving abuse of partners or ex-partners.}}
|-
| {{|Budget (Scotland) Act 2018|asp|6|28-03-2018|maintained=y|archived=n|An Act of the Scottish Parliament to make provision, for financial year 2018/19, for the use of resources by the Scottish Administration and certain bodies whose expenditure is payable out of the Scottish Consolidated Fund, for the maximum amounts of borrowing by certain statutory bodies and for authorising the payment of sums out of the Fund; to make provision, for financial year 2019/20, for authorising the payment of sums out of the Fund on a temporary basis; and for connected purposes.}}
|-
| {{|Offensive Behaviour at Football and Threatening Communications (Repeal) (Scotland) Act 2018|asp|7|19-04-2018|maintained=y|archived=n|An Act of the Scottish Parliament to repeal the Offensive Behaviour at Football and Threatening Communications (Scotland) Act 2012; and for connected purposes.}}
|-
| {{|Forestry and Land Management (Scotland) Act 2018|asp|8|01-05-2018|maintained=y|archived=n|An Act of the Scottish Parliament to make provision about Scottish Ministers' functions in relation to forestry; to make provision about Scottish Ministers' functions in relation to the management of forested land and other land; and for connected purposes.}}
|-
| {{|Social Security (Scotland) Act 2018|asp|9|01-06-2018|maintained=y|archived=n|An Act of the Scottish Parliament making provision about social security.}}
|-
| {{|Civil Litigation (Expenses and Group Proceedings) (Scotland) Act 2018|asp|10|05-06-2018|maintained=y|archived=n|An Act of the Scottish Parliament to make provision about success fee agreements; to make provision about expenses in civil litigation; to make provision about the offices of the Auditor of the Court of Session, the auditor of the Sheriff Appeal Court and the auditor of the sheriff court; and to make provision about the bringing of civil proceedings on behalf of a group of persons.}}
|-
| {{|Land and Buildings Transaction Tax (Relief from Additional Amount) (Scotland) Act 2018|asp|11|22-06-2018|maintained=y|archived=n|An Act of the Scottish Parliament to give retrospective effect to the amendments made by the Land and Buildings Transaction Tax (Additional Amount-Second Homes Main Residence Relief) (Scotland) Order 2017.}}
|-
| {{|Islands (Scotland) Act 2018|asp|12|06-07-2018|maintained=y|archived=n|An Act of the Scottish Parliament to make provision for a national islands plan; to impose duties in relation to island communities on certain public authorities; to make provision about the electoral representation of island communities; and to establish a licensing scheme in respect of marine development adjacent to islands.}}
|-
| {{|Housing (Amendment) (Scotland) Act 2018|asp|13|06-07-2018|maintained=y|archived=n|An Act of the Scottish Parliament to amend the law on the regulation of social landlords and to reduce the influence of local authorities over registered social landlords.}}
|-
| {{|Historical Sexual Offences (Pardons and Disregards) (Scotland) Act 2018|asp|14|11-07-2018|maintained=y|archived=n|An Act of the Scottish Parliament to pardon persons convicted of certain historical sexual offences and to provide a process for convictions for those offences to be disregarded.}}
|-
| {{|Prescription (Scotland) Act 2018|asp|15|18-12-2018|maintained=y|archived=n|An Act of the Scottish Parliament to amend the law relating to the extinction of rights and obligations by the passage of time.}}
}}

Additionally, the UK Withdrawal from the European Union (Legal Continuity) (Scotland) Bill was passed by the Scottish Parliament on 21 March 2018 but was referred to, and struck down by, the Supreme Court due to the passing of the European Union (Withdrawal) Act 2018, which legislated on many of the same matters and included itself on the list of protected laws that the Scottish Parliament cannot legislate on.

See also
List of Acts of the Scottish Parliament

References
Current Law Statutes Annotated 2018

2018